High School High: The Soundtrack is the soundtrack to Hart Bochner's 1996 film High School High. It was released on August 19, 1996 through Big Beat Records, and consists of hip hop and R&B music. The album features performances by the likes of A Tribe Called Quest, Artifacts, Changing Faces, D'Angelo, De La Soul, Erykah Badu, Facemob, Faith Evans, Grand Puba, Jodeci, KRS-One, Large Professor, Lil' Kim, Pete Rock, Real Live, Sadat X, Scarface, Spice 1, The Braxtons, The Braids, The Click, The Roots, Quad City DJ's, and Wu-Tang Clan members.

Several songs heard both in the movie and in the closing credits, such as "Top of the World" by The Carpenters, "Stay With Me" by Art 'N Soul, "Rhinestone Cowboy" by Glen Campbell, "Froggy Style" by Nuttin' Nyce, "Troubleneck Wreck" by the Troubleneck Brothers, "Still In Love" by Ricky Jones, were not included in the soundtrack album.

The soundtrack peaked at number 20 on the Billboard 200 and at number 4 on the Top R&B/Hip-Hop Albums chart in the United States. It was certified gold by the Recording Industry Association of America on October 23, 1996.

Complex placed the album at number 18 on their '25 Best Hip-Hop Movie Soundtracks Of All Time'.

Track listing

Charts

Weekly charts

Year-end charts

Certifications

References

External links 

1996 soundtrack albums
Hip hop soundtracks
Rhythm and blues soundtracks
Albums produced by RZA
Albums produced by K-Def
Albums produced by KRS-One
Albums produced by Stevie J
Albums produced by Pete Rock
Albums produced by Dante Ross
Albums produced by Sean Combs
Albums produced by Studio Ton
Albums produced by Eric Valentine
Albums produced by Jermaine Dupri
Albums produced by Large Professor
Albums produced by Mike Dean (record producer)
Albums produced by Q-Tip (musician)
Big Beat Records (American record label) albums
Comedy film soundtracks